Social evolution may refer to:
Sociocultural evolution, the change of cultures and societies over time
Sociobiology, explaining social behavior in terms of evolution
Cultural evolution, an evolutionary theory of social change
Evolution of eusociality, the evolution of highly cooperative behaviors in animal species
Social Evolution, an 1894 book by Benjamin Kidd